Adymus, Adymos or Hadymos, Hadymus son of Evander (perhaps Evander of Beroea) was a sculptor of the 1st century AD. His only preserved sculpture has been found in Idomene (Paeonia).

References

A History of Macedonia: Historical geography and prehistory  v. 1 by  N.G.L. Hammond Page 170 
Tataki, Argyro B. / Ancient Beroea: Prosopography and Society
List of sculptures in Archaeological Museum of Thessaloniki 73-76
Cultural and Educational Technology Institute-search Άδυμος

Ancient Beroeans
Roman-era Greeks
1st-century Greek sculptors
Roman-era Macedonians
Ancient Macedonian sculptors